Everyday Behavior  is Mêlée's first studio album released on Sub City/Hopeless Records June 29, 2004.

Track listing
All songs written and composed by Cron and Sanberg.

 "Got It All" - 3:01
 "New Day" - 3:17
 "The War" - 3:50
 "Perfect Mess" - 3:48
 "Lions Cage" - 3:13
 "Mestizos Love Song" - 3:36
 "The Curse" - 3:02
 "Sleeping Through Autumn" - 5:01
 "Hey Stranger" - 4:36
 "Routines" - 3:45
 "Pennsylvania" + hidden track - 8:15

Re-Issue Version

A re-issued version of Everyday Behavior was released on January 3, 2006.
This reissue contains two bonus tracks: "Composure" (formerly a hidden track), and "The War" (Alternate version), produced by Howard Benson.

 "Got It All" - 3:01
 "New Day" - 3:17
 "The War" - 3:50
 "Perfect Mess" - 3:48
 "Lions Cage" - 3:13
 "Mestizos Love Song" - 3:36
 "The Curse" - 3:02
 "Sleeping Through Autumn" - 5:01
 "Hey Stranger" - 4:36
 "Routines" - 3:45
 "Pennsylvania" - 4:12
 "Composure" - 1:55
 "The War" (Alternate Version) Produced by Howard Benson - 3:58

References

2004 albums
Mêlée (band) albums